On Beauty is a 2005 novel by British author Zadie Smith, loosely based on Howards End by E. M. Forster. The story follows the lives of a mixed-race British/American family living in the United States, addresses ethnic and cultural differences in both the USA and the UK, as well as the nature of beauty, and the clash between liberal and conservative academic values. It takes its title from an essay by Elaine Scarry—"On Beauty and Being Just". The Observer described the novel as a "transatlantic comic saga".

The novel was shortlisted for the 2005 Man Booker Prize on 8 September 2005. Smith won the Anisfield-Wolf Book Award for fiction and Orange Prize for Fiction in June 2006.

Plot summary

On Beauty centres around two families and their different yet increasingly intertwined lives. The Belsey family consists of university professor Howard, a white Englishman and a scholar of Rembrandt; his African-American wife Kiki; and their children, Jerome, Zora and Levi. They live in the fictional university town of Wellington, outside Boston. Howard's professional nemesis is Monty Kipps, a Trinidadian living in Britain with his wife Carlene and children Victoria and Michael.

The Belsey family has always defined itself as liberal and atheist, and Howard in particular is furious when his son Jerome, lately a born-again Christian, goes to work as an intern with the ultra-conservative Christian Kipps family over his summer holidays. After a failed affair with Victoria Kipps, Jerome returns home. However, the families are again brought closer nine months later when the Kippses move to Wellington, and Monty begins work at the university. Meanwhile, the Belsey family is facing problems of its own as they deal with the fallout of Howard's affair with his colleague and family friend Claire.

Carlene and Kiki become friends despite the tensions between their families. The women bond over a painting in Carlene's library, Maitresse Erzulie by the Haitian painter, Hector Hyppolite. Carlene tells Kiki that she purchased the painting in Haiti, prior to meeting Monty. The women see each other twice more before Carlene passes away from cancer, having kept her illness from her family. The Belseys attend Carlene's funeral in London, where Howard consummates an ongoing flirtation with his student, Victoria Kipps. While reviewing Carlene's will, the Kipps family discover that Carlene intended for Maitresse Erzulie to be left to Kiki. Believing Carlene to have not been of sound mind when making this decision, Monty hangs the painting in his university office.

The rivalry between Monty and Howard increases as Monty challenges the liberal attitudes of the university on issues such as affirmative action, which comes to a head when both men debate the topic in front of an audience of Wellington students and staff. Monty's academic success also highlights Howard's inadequacies and failure to publish a long-awaited book. Zora and Levi become friends with Carl, an African-American man of a poorer background than their own middle-class standing. Zora uses him as a poster-child for her campaign to allow talented non-students to attend university classes. For Levi, Carl is a source of identity, as a member of a more "authentic" black culture than Levi considers his own background to be.

Struggling with his mixed race identity, Levi befriends a group of Haitian men who sell counterfeit merchandise on the streets of Boston. Levi views the men as the "essence of blackness," while remaining self-conscious of being seen in public with members of the Haitian population of Wellington. Out of solidarity with his Haitian friends, many of whom experience discrimination, Levi steals the Hyppolite painting from Monty's office with his friend Chouchou, who claims that Monty bought the artwork from Haitian peasants for very little money. Upon discovering the stolen painting in Levi's room, Jerome finds a note from Carlene on the canvas, in which she gifts the painting to Kiki.

Meanwhile, Zora and Howard arrive home, and Zora reveals to Howard that she knows about two crucial affairs: his, with Victoria Kipps, and Monty Kipps’s with another student. Zora tells her mother about the second affair.

In the final scene, Howard fails to deliver a potentially career-reviving lecture. Instead, he smiles at his wife in the audience, and she returns the smile.

Inspiration
The book is loosely based on Howards End by E. M. Forster; Smith has called it an "homage". Among the parallels are the opening sections (Howards End begins with letters from Helen to her sister, On Beauty with emails from Jerome to his father); the bequeathing of a valuable item to a member of the other family (the Wilcox house Howards End is left by Ruth Wilcox to Margaret Schlegel; Carlene leaves Kiki a painting); and, more broadly, the idea of two families with very different ideas and values gradually becoming linked.

The setting of much of the novel, the fictitious Wellington College and surrounding community, contains many close parallels to the real Harvard University and Cambridge, Massachusetts. Smith wrote part of the novel as a fellow at Harvard's Radcliffe Institute.

Smith gives herself a very brief Hitchcock-style cameo in the novel: the narrator (or, indirectly, Howard) describes her as a "feckless novelist", a visiting fellow of the fictional Wellington faculty (as Smith was of Harvard's) who is quick to abandon a tedious meeting.

The failed final lecture that concludes the novel is loosely based on an infamous job talk given by former Harvard professor Leland de la Durantaye for the Harvard English Department on Lolita.

See also

 Hysterical realism
 Historiographical metafiction

References

External links
Frank Rich, "Zadie Smith's Culture Warriors" (review), The New York Times, 18 September 2005.
"A Thing of Beauty?", a review of On Beauty in The Oxonian Review of Books
Michiko Kakutani, "A Modern, Multicultural Makeover for Forster's Bourgeois Edwardians", The New York Times, 13 September 2005.
"Dear Booker Committee", a discussion of On Beauty by Stephen Metcalf of Slate.com.
 Tew, Philip. "Zadie Smith's On Beauty: Art and transatlantic antagonisms in the Anglo-American academy." Symbiosis 15 (2), 2011: 219- 236

2005 British novels
Novels by Zadie Smith
Campus novels
Women's Prize for Fiction-winning works
Novels set in Boston
Hamish Hamilton books